A series of events, births and deaths in AD 1364 in Italy:
 Battle of Cascina

Births
Niccolò de' Niccoli

Deaths
Lodrisio Visconti

References

Italy
Italy
Years of the 14th century in Italy